Stephane Grappelli/David Grisman Live is album by musicians David Grisman and Stephane Grappelli, released in 1981. It was recorded live on September 20, 1979 at Berklee center, Boston except for "Satin Doll", which was recorded on September 7, 1979 at the Great American Music Hall, San Francisco.

Track listing 

 Shine (Brown, Dabney, Mack) 5:18
 Pent-Up House (Rollins) 4:38
 Misty (Burke, Garner) 6:20
 Sweet Georgie Brown (Bernie, Pinkard, Casey) 5:13
 Tiger Rag (Hold That Tiger) (DeCosta, Edwards) 4:56
 Satin Doll (Ellington, Mercer, Strayhorn) 7:36
 Swing '42 (Reinhardt) 4:00
 Medley: Tzigani / Fisztorza / Fulginiti (Grisman) 5:42

Personnel
David Grisman – mandolin
Stephane Grappelli - violin
Mark O'Connor - guitar, violin
Rob Wasserman - bass
Mike Marshall - guitar, mandolin
 Tiny Moore - electric mandolin

Credits

Producer—David Grisman
Executive Producer—Craig Miller
Engineering—Bill Wolf
Mastering—Greg Fulginiti

References

David Grisman live albums
1981 live albums